"Christmas Isn't Canceled (Just You)" is a song by American singer Kelly Clarkson from her ninth studio album and second Christmas album, When Christmas Comes Around... (2021). Produced by Jason Halbert and Joseph Trapanese, it was released as album's lead single by Atlantic Records on September 23, 2021.

Background and release
Following the release of her sixth studio album and first Christmas album Wrapped in Red in 2013, Clarkson continued to release the holiday songs "Christmas Eve", "Under the Mistletoe" (with Brett Eldredge, and covers of Sarah McLachlan's "Wintersong" and Vince Vance & The Valiants' "All I Want for Christmas Is You".

"Christmas Isn't Canceled (Just You)" was issued by Atlantic Records on September 23, 2021, as the lead single from her ninth studio album and second Christmas album. On September 17, 2021, she shared a preview of the song's lyrical content on her social media accounts. "Christmas Isn't Canceled" was written by Clarkson with Jessi Collins and Jason Halbert, who co-produced the track with Joseph Trapanese.

Charts

Weekly charts

Year-end charts

Release history

References

2021 singles
2021 songs
Atlantic Records singles
American Christmas songs
Kelly Clarkson songs
Songs about heartache
Songs written by Kelly Clarkson